Poet and Muse is a 1978 Finnish drama film directed by Jaakko Pakkasvirta. The film is about the Finnish poet Eino Leino and the women of his life: a conflict-filled marriage with Freya Schultz and a love affair with the poet L. Onerva. It was entered into the 11th Moscow International Film Festival.

Cast
 Esko Salminen as Eino Leino
 Katja Salminen as Freya Schoultz
 Elina Salo as L. Onerva
 Paavo Liski as Kasimir Leino
 Pertti Palo as Artturi Lönnbohm
 Marita Nordberg as Freya's mother
 Heidi Krohn as Olga Lönnbohm
 Kalle Holmberg as Akseli Gallén-Kallela
 Henri Kapulainen as Jean Sibelius
 Carl-Axel Heiknert as Old Sibelius
 Jaakko Pakkasvirta as Otto Manninen
 Virpi Uimonen as Anni Swan
 Esa Pakarinen Jr. as von Numers

References

External links
 

1978 films
1978 drama films
Finnish drama films
1970s Finnish-language films